Timocratica is a moth genus of the family Depressariidae.

Species
monotonia species group
 Timocratica major (Busck, 1911)
 Timocratica agramma Becker, 1982
 Timocratica longicilia Becker, 1982
 Timocratica pompeiana Meyrick, 1925
 Timocratica monotonia (Strand, 1911)
 Timocratica meridionalis Becker, 1982
 Timocratica loxotoma (Busck, 1910)
 Timocratica fraternella (Busck, 1910)

leucocapna species group
 Timocratica leucocapna (Meyrick, 1926)
 Timocratica effluxa (Meyrick, 1930)

albella species group
 Timocratica grandis (Perty, [1833])
 Timocratica bicornuta Becker, 1982
 Timocratica xanthotarsa Becker, 1982
 Timocratica constrictivalva Becker, 1982
 Timocratica subovalis (Meyrick, 1932)
 Timocratica amseli Duckworth, 1962
 Timocratica venifurcata Becker, 1982
 Timocratica fuscipalpalis Becker, 1982
 Timocratica xanthosoma (Dognin, 1913)
 Timocratica anelaea (Meyrick, 1932)
 Timocratica titanoleuca Becker, 1982
 Timocratica macroleuca (Meyrick, 1932)
 Timocratica leucorectis (Meyrick, 1925)
 Timocratica spinignatha Becker, 1982
 Timocratica argonais (Meyrick, 1925)
 Timocratica maturescens (Meyrick, 1925)
 Timocratica megaleuca (Meyrick, 1912)
 Timocratica palpalis (Zeller, 1877)
 Timocratica melanocosta Becker, 1982
 Timocratica nivea Becker, 1982
 Timocratica albitogata Becker, 1982
 Timocratica melanostriga Becker, 1982
 Timocratica isarga (Meyrick, 1925)
 Timocratica albella (Zeller, 1839)
 Timocratica guarani Becker, 1982
 Timocratica philomela (Meyrick, 1925)
 Timocratica parvileuca Becker, 1982
 Timocratica butyrota (Meyrick, 1929)
 Timocratica parvifusca Becker, 1982

References

 
Stenomatinae
Moth genera